Administration of State Guard of Ukraine is a law enforcement agency in Ukraine that is subordinated to the President of Ukraine and under control of the Verkhovna Rada (Ukraine's national parliament).

Objectives
 providing a state guard to bodies of state power of Ukraine
 ensuring security of officials identified by Law at place of their location as in Ukraine as in abroad
 ensuring security of officials' family members identified by Law who live with them or escort them
 prevent illegal encroachment on officials and their family members as well as objects under the state security, their detection and suppression
 guarding objects identified by Law
 ensuring a secure operation of vehicles intended for specified by Law officials

History
The agency was created on January 15, 1992, as administration in guarding the higher officials and was renamed in the summer of the same year. Its direct history as a direct successor of the Soviet state structure it traces back to 1975, when the 9th KGB service was created out of the Ministry of State Security of Ukrainian SSR. From September 1991 to January 1992 the service was called the 9th Guard Administration of the National Security Service of Ukraine. 

Providing security for higher officials, however, has a much longer history in Ukraine. Such services are known to have existed in the Cossack Hetmanate and the Ukrainian State.

Long Service Medal

References

External links
 English version of the official website
 Official website

Law enforcement agencies of Ukraine
Presidency of Ukraine